Llandudno Pier is a Grade II* listed pier in the seaside resort of Llandudno, North Wales, United Kingdom. At , the pier is the longest in Wales and the fifth longest in England and Wales. In 2005, was voted "Pier of the Year 2005" by the members of the National Piers Society.

At the end of the pier is a deep-water landing stage, completely rebuilt for the third time in 1969, which is used by the Isle of Man Steam Packet Company for occasional excursions to Douglas, Isle of Man, and for an annual visit of the PS Waverley or the MV Balmoral preserved steamers. The June 2007 sailings of the Balmoral were rescheduled to start at Menai Bridge Pier, after it emerged that Llandudno Pier's Landing Stage was no longer safe to use. The Landing Stage was rebuilt in 2012 and the MV Balmoral called there, the first ship since 2006, on 2 July 2015.  
In the present day the landing stage is no longer used for steamers but has its use as a platform for anglers to fish off the end of the pier and is not accessible to the general public.

Location
Located on the coast of North Wales between Bangor and Colwyn Bay, the pier is very unusual in that it has two entrances, one on the promenade at North Parade and the other, the original entrance, on Happy Valley Road (Which is no longer used and is locked permanently)  Between the two entrances is the Grand Hotel.

History

Early wooden pier
The pier had its origins in a much shorter pier of just  built on 16 wooden piles, opened in 1858 by the St George's Harbour and Railway Company, which had just completed its branch line from Llandudno to Conwy via a junction with the Chester and Holyhead Railway near the present Llandudno Junction railway station to which the branch was soon diverted. That short pier was built to protect the rights of its owners to a much more ambitious scheme to build a major port in Llandudno Bay. Unfortunately, the pier was severely damaged in the Royal Charter Storm of 25 October 1859, which caused the loss of 223 ships and 800 people in British coastal waters. Although repaired and used for a further 16 years, the pier was too short and could only be used by steam ships at high tide.

Construction

The present pier was designed by civil engineers Sir James William Brunlees (1816-92, knighted 1886) and Alexander McKerrow (1837-1920) and built by the contractor John Dixon for the Llandudno Pier Company. After the original designs were approved on 29 May 1876 by Parliament, the town's Improvement Commissioners and the Mostyn Estate, revised designs for the ornamental ironwork and elaborate kiosks were worked on by the architects Charles Henry Driver (1832-1900 ) and Charles H. Rew for Brunlees and McKerrow, in close collaboration with the Glasgow Elmbank foundry.

The new pier was reported to have cost around £30,000 to construct. The first pile was driven by Lord Authur Hill-Trevor on 16 September 1876, initiating the start of a 10 month long construction period. By this time,  of pier had already been completed.

Opening
The pier was opened to the public on 1 August 1877 by director Dr Nicol. Although not completely finished by this time, the pier directors considered it was sufficiently complete to allow public access. According to The North Wales Chronicle, upon opening, "a throng of visitors flocked upon it and it presented quite a lively appearance". The first steamboat to land passengers on the new pier was the Prince Authur, which arrived in Llandudno at the start of May 1878.

Operation
The pier sustained its first damage during a heavy storm in November 1878, when the landing stage under the pier sustained light damage. The landwards extension to the same design, still in deep water and also supported on iron columns, was opened in 1884 and a new landing stage was added in 1891.

Towards the end of 1907, the owners announced intentions through an application to the Board of Trade to widen the pier, extend it by sea dredging and to construct pavilions and a tramway. By 1908, the pier would often be overcrowded during the summer season, causing inconvenience to passengers boarding and alighting from steamboats.

By the start of 1910, the pier was very profitable, allowing the directors to carry out extensive improvements to the pier at a cost of £10,000, which included widening most of the pier. Reports suggested that neighbouring towns were envious of the success of the pier and the revenue it was bringing to Llandudno. Concerts in the pier's pavilion were very popular and profitable, with an average surplus of approximately £25 reported in November 1910, despite expenses of around £620 which included financing a music festival.

20th century
In 1969, the landing stage was totally rebuilt in concrete and steel, which enabled its use by the largest Isle of Man Steamers then in use. By 1972, the pier was well known for day trips by ferry to the Isle of Man, although at this time could itself boast pavilion concerts, vintage car rides and various amusements. The wooden decking has been extensively renewed in recent years, and the superstructure is maintained systematically.

In March 2015, the pier was put up for sale by then owners Cuerden Leisure, who reported that there was "strong interest" from investors in the £4.5m pier. It was one of three piers being sold by the company, the others being Central Pier, Blackpool and South Pier, Blackpool, although Llandudno Pier was attracting the strongest interest. The pier was purchased in May 2015 by leisure entrepreneur Adam Williams for the £4.5m asking price and his company Tir Prince Leisure Group, after having attracted a large amount of interest.

The Pier Pavilion

Until the Second World War, the public were charged admission to access the pier. Admission allowed the promenaders access to musical entertainment from a bandstand at the pierhead. A small orchestra was established in 1877. The notable French musician, Jules Rivière was appointed to take charge of the orchestra in 1887.

The orchestral performances moved to the Pier Pavilion, built on land adjacent to the main entrance from the promenade, which opened in September 1886. Rivière's Orchestra at the Llandudno Pier Pavilion trebled in size to symphony proportions. The young Henry Wood came to Llandudno to observe the then elderly Rivière at work. The pavilion was destroyed by fire in 1994 and not rebuilt.

Cultural references
Llandudno Pier is known to be chosen for Victorian and Edwardian seaside filming locations, such as the 2002 TV production of The Forsyte Saga. It also featured on a 2013 advert for Volkswagen. It is the setting of an episode in Arnold Bennett's 1911 comic novel The Card.

Awards
2005 — National Piers Society — Pier of the Year

References
Citations

Sources

External links

The history of Llandudno Pier
History of Llandudno Pier
Llandudno Pier Photo Gallery
Llandudno Pier Website

Piers in Wales
Buildings and structures in Llandudno
Grade II* listed buildings in Conwy County Borough
Charles Henry Driver buildings
Grade II* listed piers